Temghar Dam, is an earthfill and gravity dam on Mutha river near Mulashi, Pune district in the state of Maharashtra in India.

Specifications

Purpose
 Irrigation
 Power Generation

Leakage
There are leakages in Temghar Dam wall which are believed to be dangerous to the dam. The leakage has increased than before according to media report. However the Maharashtra government authorities state that the dam is safe and they will soon solve the leakage problem. Girish Mahajan, Maharashtra state water resource minister stated said that inquiry about this issue will also carried out as this dam was opened in 2001 and leakages started in just 15 years. However care needs to be taken to prevent Panshet dam tragedy in 1961.

Power Station
The Hydro Power Plant of 1 X 4 MW installed capacity has been set up at Dam Toe in year 2017 and commissioned in the year 2019. One unit of Horizontal Francis Turbine with Synchronous Generator has been installed. The electricity produced is being evacuated to nearest MSETCL's Pirangut Substation.

See also
 Dams in Maharashtra
 List of reservoirs and dams in India

References

External links
Temghar Dam

Dams in Pune district
Dams completed in 2000
2000 establishments in Maharashtra